Psoralidium lanceolatum (syn. Ladeania lanceolata) is a species of flowering plant in the legume family known by several common names, including lemon scurfpea, wild lemonweed, and dune scurfpea.

It is native to western North America from central Canada to California to Texas, where it grows in sandy habitat, such as alluvial plains and sagebrush.

It is a perennial herb with a branching, heavily glandular stem growing 30 to 60 centimeters tall. The leaves are palmately compound, each made up of usually three linear or lance-shaped leaflets borne on a short petiole. The inflorescence is a raceme of flowers emerging from a leaf axil. Each flower is under a centimeter long with a pealike corolla in shades of light purple-blue to white. The fruit is a hairy, glandular, spherical legume.

The Zuni people eat the fresh flowers to treat stomachaches.

References

External links
Psoralidium lanceolatum. USDA PLANTS.
CalPhotos.

Psoraleeae
Plants used in traditional Native American medicine
Plants described in 1813